Sisters & Brothers is a 2011 Canadian comedy-drama film written and directed by Carl Bessai. The film explores the relationships of four sets of siblings who have not (in one case, never) had contact for some time. It is the final film in Bessai's Family X trilogy exploring family relations, following Mothers & Daughters (2008) and Fathers & Sons (2010).

The film had its world premiere at the Toronto International Film Festival on September 8, 2011, followed by a limited release in Canada on March 23, 2012.

Cast
 Cory Monteith as Justin
 Dustin Milligan as Rory, Justin's brother
 Amanda Crew as Nikki, an actress
 Benjamin Ratner as Jerry, a schizophrenic
 Gabrielle Miller as Louise, Jerry's sister
 Jay Brazeau as Ringo, Jerry's "lawyer"
 Camille Sullivan as Maggie, Nikki's half-sister
 Tom Scholte as Henry, the 'producer', meets Nikki
 Kacey Rohl as Sarah, no siblings until the Sita surprise
 Gabrielle Rose as Marion, Sarah and Sita's mother
 Leena Manro as Sita, Sarah's (surprise) half-sister

Production
The main performances are improvised, resulting in the eleven main performers, along with writer and director Bessai, being credited under the heading "A Collective Creation By". Filming took place in Vancouver and Los Angeles.

References

External links
 

2011 films
2011 comedy-drama films
Canadian comedy-drama films
English-language Canadian films
Films about siblings
Films directed by Carl Bessai
Films shot in Los Angeles
Films shot in Vancouver
Films set in Vancouver
2010s English-language films
2010s Canadian films